Ferdinando Fairfax, 2nd Lord Fairfax of Cameron MP (29 March 1584 – 14 March 1648) was an English nobleman and politician who sat in the House of Commons at various times between 1614 and 1648. He was a commander in the Parliamentary army in the English Civil War.

He should not be confused with his better known son, Thomas Fairfax, who commanded the New Model Army.

Early life

He was born in Yorkshire, the eldest son of Ellen Aske and Thomas Fairfax, 1st Lord Fairfax of Cameron, whom Charles I in 1627 created Lord Fairfax of Cameron in the Peerage of Scotland and received a military education in the Netherlands. Two of his brothers were Henry Fairfax and Charles Fairfax. Four others were killed on military service overseas.

Political career
He served as member of the English parliament for Boroughbridge during the six parliaments which met between 1614 and 1629 and also during the Short Parliament of 1640. In May 1640 he succeeded his father as Lord Fairfax, but being a Scottish peer he sat in the English House of Commons as one of the representatives of Yorkshire during the Long Parliament from 1640 until his death. He took the side of the parliament, but held moderate views and desired to maintain the peace. His main seat was Denton Hall in Wharfedale, Yorkshire.

Military service
In the first Bishops' War Fairfax had commanded a regiment in the king's army; then on the outbreak of the English Civil War in 1642 he became commander of the parliamentary forces in Yorkshire, with Newcastle as his opponent. Hostilities began after the repudiation of a treaty of neutrality entered into by Fairfax with the Royalists. At first Fairfax met with no success. He was driven from York, where he was besieging the Royalists, to Selby; then in 1643 to Leeds; and after beating off an attack at that place he was totally defeated on 30 June 1643 at the Battle of Adwalton Moor. He escaped to Hull, which he successfully defended against Newcastle from 2 September until 11 October 1643, and by means of a brilliant sally caused the siege to be raised. Fairfax was victorious at Selby on 11 April 1644, and joining the Scots, besieged York, after which he was present at the Battle of Marston Moor (2 July 1644), where he commanded the infantry and was routed. He was subsequently, in July 1644, made Governor of York and charged with the further reduction of the county. In December 1644 he took the town of Pontefract, but failed to secure the castle.

Robert, Earl of Essex (1643), describing the victorious sally at Hull.

Later life
Fairfax resigned his command on the passing of the Self-denying Ordinance, but remained a member of the Committee for the Government of Yorkshire and was appointed, on 24 July 1645, steward of the manor of Pontefract. He died from an accident which caused gangrene in his foot on 14 March 1648 and was buried at Bolton Percy in Yorkshire.

Marriages and issue
Fairfax had married twice. By his first wife, Mary, daughter of Edmund Sheffield (afterwards 1st Earl of Mulgrave), he had six daughters and two sons: Thomas Fairfax, who succeeded him as the third Lord Fairfax, and Charles, a colonel of horse, who was killed at Marston Moor. He married his second wife, Rhoda Chapman, widow of Thomas Hussey, in October 1646: they had one child, a daughter Ursula.

References

External links
 Archival Material at 

Attribution:

|-

1584 births
1648 deaths
Roundheads
Ferdinando
Members of the Parliament of England for constituencies in Yorkshire
Accidental deaths in England
Parliamentarian military personnel of the English Civil War
English MPs 1614
English MPs 1621–1622
English MPs 1624–1625
English MPs 1625
English MPs 1626
English MPs 1628–1629
English MPs 1640 (April)
English MPs 1640–1648
Lords of Parliament (pre-1707)
Lords Fairfax of Cameron